WEC 43: Cerrone vs. Henderson was a mixed martial arts event held by World Extreme Cagefighting on October 10, 2009 at the AT&T Center in San Antonio, Texas.

Background

The event was scheduled to take place on September 2, 2009 at the Covelli Centre in Youngstown, Ohio. However, due to headliner Benson Henderson having eye surgery, the event was later rescheduled.

The main event was expected to be a WEC Lightweight Championship bout between current champion Jamie Varner and challenger Donald Cerrone.  This was to be a rematch of their bout at WEC 38 which ended in a controversial technical split decision, but Varner was deemed medically unable to return to competition. Instead, the WEC had Cerrone face Benson Henderson, for the WEC Interim Lightweight Championship, with the winner fighting Varner in a title unification bout when he was medically cleared. The Varner/Cerrone rematch would later take place at WEC 51 the following year (though after Varner lost the title), where Cerrone won by unanimous decision.

A previously announced bout between Alex Karalexis and Anthony Pettis has been cancelled due to an injury suffered by Karalexis while training. The fight was rescheduled for WEC 48.

Mark Hominick was expected to face Deividas Taurosevičius at the event, but was forced from the bout with an injury and replaced by Javier Vazquez.

Erik Koch was expected to face Wagnney Fabiano at the event, but was forced from the bout with an injury and replaced by promotional newcomer Mackens Semerzier.

Rafael Rebello was originally scheduled to face Scott Jorgensen at this event, but was removed from the bout and replaced by Noah Thomas.

Akitoshi Tamura was expected to compete against Damacio Page at this event, but was pulled from the card due to injury and replaced by WEC newcomer Will Campuzano.

The event drew an estimated 419,000 viewers on Versus.

Results

Bonus Awards
Fighters were awarded $10,000 bonuses, with the Fight of the Night earners having their bonuses doubled to $20,000 each.

Fight of the Night:  Donald Cerrone vs.  Benson Henderson
Knockout of the Night:  Anthony Njokuani
Submission of the Night:  Mackens Semerzier

See also
 World Extreme Cagefighting
 List of World Extreme Cagefighting champions
 List of WEC events
 2009 in WEC

External links
Official WEC website

References

World Extreme Cagefighting events
Events in San Antonio
2009 in mixed martial arts
Mixed martial arts in Texas
Sports competitions in San Antonio
2009 in sports in Texas